Capybara Games is an independent game studio based out of Toronto, Ontario, Canada. The studio was founded in 2003 from a collection of Toronto IGDA members. The company is most known for developing 2011's Superbrothers: Sword & Sworcery EP and 2014's Super Time Force.

Games developed

References

External links

2003 establishments in Ontario
Canadian companies established in 2003
Companies based in Toronto
Video game companies established in 2003
Video game companies of Canada
Video game development companies
Indie video game developers